The 1995–96 Ukrainian Second League is the fifth season of 3rd level professional football in Ukraine. The league was reorganized and, since being split three seasons ago, merged with the lower league tier known as Ukrainian Third League. Most teams of the lower league were promoted, while the Second League was divided into two groups based geographical location of clubs.

Teams
The league was merged with Ukrainian Third League bringing the top 16 teams of the 1994–95 league's season along with the newly promoted teams from amateurs.

Promoted teams
 FC Kalush - Group 1 winner of the Amateur League (debut)
 Haray Zhovkva - Group 2 winner of the Amateur League (debut)
 Obolon Kyiv - Group 3 winner of the Amateur League (debut)
 Sportinvest Kryvyi Rih - Group 4 winner of the Amateur League (debut)
 Dynamo Sloviansk - Group 5 winner of the Amateur League (debut)
 Portovyk Illichivsk - Group 6 winner of the Amateur League (debut)
 Hirnyk Komsomolsk - Group 3 fifth place of the Amateur League (debut)
 Shakhtar Sverdlovsk - Group 5 second place of the Amateur League (debut)
 Prometei Dniprodzerzhynsk - Group 5 eleventh place of the Amateur League (debut)

Relegated teams
 Karpaty Mukacheve  – 21st place of the First League (debut)
 Ahrotekhservis Sumy – 22nd place of the First League (debut)

Replaced/merged teams
 Olimpiya Yuzhnoukrainsk (Amateur League Group 6) replaced withdrawn Artaniya Ochakiv
 Sportinvest Kryvyi Rih (Amateur League Group 4) merged and replaced Sirius Kryvyi Rih
 Dynamo-Dahma Odesa (Amateur League Group 6) replaced withdrawn Chornomorets-2 Odesa
 Metalurh Donetsk reorganized during the season in place of bankrupted Shakhtar Shakhtarsk
 Metalurh Mariupol, previously as Azovets, merged with and replace Dynamo Luhansk
 Temp-Advis-2 Khemlnytskyi before season was FC Advis Khmelnytskyi that merged with FC Temp Shepetivka becoming its reserve team

Withdrawn teams
Okean Kerch withdrew before start of the season.
Vahonobudivnyk Kremenchuk that was recently promoted from the Ukrainian Third League withdrew before start of the season.

Renamed teams
Krystal Kherson was called Vodnyk Kherson
Nyva-Kosmos Myronivka was called Nyva Myronivka
FC Kalush was called Khimik Kalush
Ros Bila Tserkva was called Transimpeks-Ros Bila Tserkva
FC Kakhovka was called Meliorator Kakhovka
Ahrotekhservis Sumy was called FC Sumy
Skify Lviv was called Skify-LAZ Lviv
Kosmos Pavlohrad was called Shakhtar Pavlohrad
Shakhtar Shakhtarsk was called Medita Shakhtarsk
Obolon Kyiv was called Obolon-Zmina Kyiv
Dynamo-Flesh Odesa was called Dynamo-Dahma Odesa
Metalurh Mariupol was called Azovets Mariupol

Location map

Group A

Top goalscorers

Group B

Top goalscorers

Play off
Play off game was announced as soon as FC Naftokhimik Kremenchuk that competed in the First League decided to withdraw from competitions. The game was scheduled among two runners-up from each of two groups FC Krystal Kherson and FC Metalurh Donetsk.

Metalurh Donetsk won play off game and promoted to the 1996-97 Ukrainian First League.

See also
 1995–96 Ukrainian Premier League
 1995–96 Ukrainian First League
 1995–96 Ukrainian Cup

References

External links
 1995-96 Ukrainian Transitional League (Aleksei Kobyzev, Russian)
 1995-96 Ukrainian Transitional League (Dmitriy Troschiy, Russian)

Ukrainian Second League seasons
3
Ukra